Miguel Armando "Nando" Vera (May 3, 1932 – September 21, 1952) was a United States Army soldier who was killed in the Korean War and a posthumous recipient of the Medal of Honor for his actions during the Battle of Old Baldy.

Biographical details
Vera was born in Adjuntas, Puerto Rico and joined the U.S. Army when he was 17 years old.

After Vera was killed in action in the Korean War, his body was transferred to Puerto Rico where he was buried with full military honors in the Utuado Municipal Cemetery, Utuado, Puerto Rico. Years later, in November 2014, Vera was reburied at Arlington National Cemetery in Arlington, Virginia.

Medal of Honor

The bestowal of the Medal of Honor recognized Vera for his actions at Chorwon, North Korea, on September 21, 1952. While Vera's unit attempted to retake the right sector of Old Baldy, it came under heavy fire at close range and was forced back. Vera selflessly chose to stay and cover the troops' withdrawal, and lost his life during this action.

Vera was posthumously bestowed the Medal of Honor by President Obama in a March 18, 2014 White House ceremony.

The bestowal of the Medal of Honor was in accordance with the National Defense Authorization Act which called for a review of Jewish American and Hispanic American veterans from World War II, the Korean War and the Vietnam War to ensure that no prejudice was shown to those deserving the Medal of Honor.

Medal of Honor citation

Awards and decorations

See also

List of Puerto Ricans
List of Puerto Rican military personnel
 List of Korean War Medal of Honor recipients
List of Puerto Rican recipients of the Medal of Honor
List of Hispanic Medal of Honor recipients

Notes

References

1932 births
1952 deaths
American military personnel killed in the Korean War
Korean War recipients of the Medal of Honor
Puerto Rican recipients of the Medal of Honor
People from Adjuntas, Puerto Rico
Puerto Rican Army personnel
United States Army Medal of Honor recipients
United States Army soldiers
Burials at Arlington National Cemetery
United States Army personnel of the Korean War